The Father is a 1989 play by British playwright John Osborne.

External links
Publishing info

1989 plays
Plays by John Osborne